Nikolay Moiseev is a Russian Lead Spacesuit Designer. He was exclusively featured by the documentary series "Made By Russians" for his work in the space industry. He specializes in glove design. He is a co-founder of Final Frontier Design and currently lives in Brooklyn, New York.

Biography

Nikolay Moiseev has over 20 years of space suit experience from the Russian space suit agency, NPP Zvezda, and is one of the few engineers to work with all of the current in-service space suit designs, including America's EMU and ACES, and the Russian Orlan and Sokol. He studied a masters at Moscow Aviation Institute.

Nik took part in the NASA Astronaut Glove Challenge in 2007. In 2009, Ted Southern and Nik took home a cash prize and created Final Frontier Design from the winnings with Nikolay Moiseev

Nikolay is the Chief Engineer and Designer at Final Frontier Design. He hopes one day to have Final Frontier Design suits on Mars.

References

External links
https://www.linkedin.com/in/nik-moiseev-3b5401248/
http://madebyrussians.ru/nikolay_moiseev
https://www.tamilxxx.osholikes.com
https://www.tamilkamakatha.com

Living people
Russian designers
Spacesuits
1962 births